Kedarnath Bhattacharya (born 20 October 1957), professionally known as Kumar Sanu, is an Indian playback singer. He is known as the King of Melody in Bollywood.  He is famous for singing thousands of Bollywood Hindi songs. Apart from Hindi, he has also sung in other languages including Bengali, Marathi, Nepali, Assamese, Bhojpuri, Gujarati, Manipuri, Telugu, Malayalam, Kannada, Tamil, Punjabi, Odia, Chhattisgarhi, Urdu, Pali, English and his native language Bengali, both in West Bengal and Bangladesh. He holds the record for winning five consecutive Filmfare Award for Best Male Playback Singer from 1990 to 1994. For his contribution to Indian cinema and music, he was awarded the Padma Shri in 2009 by the Government of India. Many of his tracks feature in BBC's "Top 40 Bollywood Soundtracks of all time".

Early life 

Kumar Sanu's father, Pashupati Bhattacharya, was a vocalist and composer. The two and Sanu's elder sister lived in the Sinthee area of Calcutta (now Kolkata) near Biswanath Park. Kumar Sanu lived at Panchanan tala at Gopal Bose Lane in Sinthi area at North Kolkata.

Career

Sanu started his playback career as Sanu Bhattacharya from 1984. In 1986, he was in the Bangladeshi film Teen Kanya, directed by Shibli Sadiq. He had his first major Bollywood song in Hero Hiralal (1988).

In 1989, Jagjit Singh introduced Sanu to Kalyanji in Vimal Bunglow, Mumbai. On their suggestion, Sanu changed his early name from "Sanu Bhattacharya" to "Kumar Sanu" after his idol Kishore Kumar. Sanu then relocated to Mumbai, where Kalyanji-Anandji gave him a chance to sing in the film Jaadugar.

For the 1990 film Aashiqui, Sanu sang all but one of the songs. He won the first of his record five consecutive Filmfare Awards as Best Male Playback Singer. His next Filmfare Awards came for songs in the movies Saajan (1991), Deewana (1992), Baazigar (1993) and 1942: A Love Story (1994). He won 5 back to back Filmfare awards for singing, between 1990 and 1994.

Significant collaborations

Nadeem–Shravan

Kumar Sanu got his major break when Gulshan Kumar with music directors Nadeem and Shravan gave him chance to sing most of the songs of movie Aashiqui (1990), songs were recorded earlier for an album and later movie was made around the songs. The movie as well as the songs were a grand success. Thereafter, they worked together in many films, including Apmaan Ki Aag (1990), Saajan (1991), Phool Aur Kaante (1991),  Dil Hai Ki Manta Nahin (1991), Sadak (1991), Pyaar Ka Saaya (1991), Saathi (1991), Jaan Ki Kasam (1991), Deewana (1992), Dil Ka Kya Kasoor (1992), Jaan Tere Naam (1992), Sapne Sajan Ke (1992), Anaam (1992), Paayal (1992), Panaah (1992),  Bekhudi (1992), Kal Ki Awaaz (1992), Dilwale Kabhi Na Hare  (1993), Hum Hain Rahi Pyar Ke (1993), Sainik (1993), Junoon (1992), Balmaa (1993), Waqt Hamara Hai (1993), Rang (1993), Dil Tera Aashiq (1993), Tadipaar (1993), Sangraam (1993), Shreeman Aashiq (1993), Dhartiputra (1993), Kaise Kaise Rishte (1993), Aadmi Khilona Hai (1993), Divya Shakti (1993), Damini (1993), Dilwale (1994), Stuntman (1994), Aatish (1994), Salaami (1994), Chhoti Bahu (1994), Ekka Raja Rani (1994), Saajan Ka Ghar (1994), Kranti Kshetra (1994), Andolan (1995), Gaddar (1995), Barsaat (1995), Anokha Andaaz (1995), Saajan Ki Baahon Mein (1995), Zamaana Deewana (1995), Raja Hindustani (1996), Agnisakshi (1996), Majhdhaar (1996), Himmatvar (1996), Jeet  (1996), Saajan Chale Sasural (1996), Pardes (1997), Naseeb (1997), Aa Ab Laut Chalen (1999), Sirf Tum (1999), Dhadkan (2000), Kasoor (2001), Hum Ho Gaye Aapke (2001), Ek Rishtaa: The Bond of Love (2001), Yeh Dil Aashiqanaa (2002), Ansh (2002), Haan Maine Bhi Pyaar Kiya (2002), Dil Hai Tumhaara (2002), Tum Se Achcha Kaun Hai (2002), Dil Ka Rishta (2003), Qayamat (2003), Footpath (2003), Andaaz (2003), Indian Babu (2003), Hungama (2003), Sheen (2004), Hatya (2004), Gumnaam (2004), Barsaat (2005), Mere Jeevan Saathi (2006), and Sanam Teri Kasam (2009). He sang most of his songs for them (293 songs).

Anu Malik 
Sanu has sung songs of various genres with Anu Malik. It was Malik who made Sanu sing his first western-style song "Yeh Kaali Kaali Aankhe", from the film Baazigar (1993). Some other achievements of the combo are Chamatkar (1992), Phir Teri Kahani Yaad Aayee (1993), Sir (1993), Imtihaan (1994), Vijaypath (1994), Main Khiladi Tu Anari (1994), Naaraaz (1994), Yaar Gaddar (1994), Hum Hain Bemisaal (1994), Aa Gale Lag Jaa (1994),  Naajayaz (1995), Gundaraj (1995), Hulchul (1995), Akele Hum Akele Tum (1995), Diljale (1996), Sapoot (1996), Daraar (1996), Chaahat (1996), Virasat (1997), Hamesha (1997), Dil Kitna Nadaan Hai (1997), Judwaa (1997), Tamanna (1997), Duplicate (1998), Kareeb (1998), Soldier (1998), Iski Topi Uske Sarr (1998),  Hum To Mohabbat Karega (2000), Ajnabee  (2001), Aan: Men at Work (2003), Ishq Vishq (2003), Fida (2004) and No Entry (2005). In 2015, they were again back with songs in Dum Laga Ke Haisha

Jatin–Lalit 
Sanu started his work with Jatin–Lalit on the 1992 film Khiladi. From then on he provided his voice for hit movies including Raju Ban Gaya Gentleman (1992), Kabhi Haan Kabhi Naa (1993), Boy Friend  (1993), Dilwale Dulhania Le Jayenge (1995),  Khamoshi (1996), Yes Boss (1997), Jab Pyaar Kisise Hota Hai (1998), Kuch Kuch Hota Hai (1998), Pyaar To Hona Hi Tha (1998),  Ghulam (1998),  Dil Kya Kare (1999), Khubsoorat (1999), Sangharsh (1999), Yeh Hai Mumbai Meri Jaan (1999), Vaastav (1999), Sarfarosh (1999) and Flames- Term 2 (The Timeliners Originals) (2019). He has sung a total of 137 songs for them.

Himesh 
Sanu worked for Himesh Reshammiya, for all title tracks of TV serials which Reshammiya produced. All the title tracks were sung by Sanu, and then in his debut film as a music director,  Pyaar Kiya To Darna Kya and further for many other films such as Kurukshetra, Yeh Hai Jalwa, Humraaz, Kahin Pyaar Na Ho Jaaye, Hello Brother, Bandhan, Dulhan Hum Le Jayenge, Jodi No.1, Uljhan and Taarzan.

Rajesh Roshan 
Beginning with "Jab Koi Baat Bigad Jaye" in the movie Jurm (1990), Sanu's collaboration with Rajesh Roshan produced one hit after another. Significant movies include Karan Arjun (1995), Sabse Bada Khiladi (1995), Papa Kehte Hai (1996), Dastak (1996), Koyla (1997), Kaho Naa... Pyaar Hai (2000), Kya Kehna (2000), Karobaar (2000)  and Aetbaar (2004).
Kaun Sachcha Kaun Jhootha 1996

Viju Shah 
Kumar Sanu has rendered his voice for some of Viju Shah's greatest compositions. Vishwatma (1992), Mohra (1994), Tere Mere Sapne (1996), Gupt (1997), Aar Ya Paar (1997),  Beti No. 1 (1999), Bulandi (2000), Pyaar Ishq Aur Mohabbat (2001) and  Kasam (2001) are some of their notable albums. Ravan Raaj: A True Story

Anand–Milind 
Kumar Sanu has recorded over 150 songs with Anand–Milind. Breaking away from his romantic image, he has sung peppy numbers for the duo, his most famous ones being for actor Govinda. He worked with the duo and successfully delivered hits such as Trinetra (1991), Jigar (1992), Bol Radha Bol (1992), Insaniyat Ke Devta (1992), Ek Ladka Ek Ladki (1992), Suryavanshi (1992), Hasti (1992), Giraft (1992), Platform (1992), Raja Babu (1994), Suhaag (1994), Jai Kishan (1994), Coolie No 1 (1995), Hero No. 1 (1997), Gair (1998), Chal Mere Bhai (2000), Army (1996), Lootere (1993), Gopi Kishan (1994) and Rakshak (1996).

Other work 
Sanu has released albums of Kishore Kumar's songs including Kishore Ki Yaadein, a collection early in his career. Then came the Yaadein series where he sang many of the songs of Kishore Kumar along with singers Abhijeet Bhattacharya and Vinod Rathod.

Sanu has composed music for various Indian films. Utthaan and Yeh Sunday Kyun Aata Hai are most remarkable among them. Lata Mangeshkar, Asha Bhosle, Kavita Krishnamurthy, Anuradha Paudwal, Sapna Mukherjee, Alka Yagnik, Sonu Nigam, Sadhana Sargam, Sudesh Bhonsle, Shaan, Shreya Ghosal, Hema Sardesai, Sunidhi Chauhan and many more lent their voices for his music. "Yeh Kaisa Utthhan Hai" (sung by Asha Bhosle and Sonu Nigam in two different versions) and "Jisne Sapna Dekha" (sung by Sanu himself) are critically acclaimed. He sang the title song for the TV show Yeh Duniyan Gazab Ki, with singer Udit Narayan.

In 2017, Sanu along with Sadhna Sargam sung for the title track of 19s Story based TV Series "Yeh Un Dinon Ki Baat Hain" and also appeared as a part for cameo in it. In 2019, he made a little singing for the Star Plus's "Kulfi Kumarr Bajewala".

Other than singing and composing music for films, he has also shown interest in producing films. In 2006, he produced his first Hindi film Utthaan. Currently, he is working with a fellow producer, Rakesh Bhhatia on a new project named Yeh Sunday Kyun Aata Hai. The film is based on the lives of four children who live in the streets of Mumbai and polish shoes at a train station in order to earn their livelihoods. The film will feature Mithun Chakraborty in a leading role. Recently, Sanu sang for a Bangladeshi Bengali film Hason Raja, which was directed by a UK-based filmmaker Ruhul Amin. This movie was never released. He also has composed for some Bengali movies; Amrita and Tobu Aporichito.

Sanu was on the panel of judges on Sony TV for Waar Parriwar, a reality show based on the bringing together of a singing gharana (family of singers) and on Zee TV in a music reality show called Sa Re Ga Ma Pa. In 2012, he judged the Zee Bangla musical reality show Sa Re Ga Ma Pa – Gane Gane Tomar Mone. At present, he is one of the judges of the Star Jalsha popular musical reality show Super Singer.

Recently he recorded an album named Hum aur Tum. He also recorded a Spanish song for an album. He has also the record for the most recordings of songs in a single day, 28 songs. He also made special appearances as an actor in the movies sapne sajan ke Hum Aapke Dil Mein Rehte Hain (1999) and Dum Laga Ke Haisha (2015).

Sanu is a trustee and Brand Ambassador of Bishwa Bandhan, a foundation for cerebral palsy.

Sanu opened a primary school, Kumar Sanu Vidya Niketan, for underprivileged children in Karol Bagh, Delhi. The students are given uniforms and books free of cost.

In 2022 Sanu collaborated with music director Vaibhav Saxena and two young singers for "Mohabbat Mein tere sanam" which was released and distributed worldwide by new-age Record Label Vusic Records.

Work with other singers 
Sanu had multiple hit duet numbers with singers Lata Mangeshkar, Asha Bhosle, K.S.Chithra,Anuradha Paudwal, Alka Yagnik, Kavita Krishnamurthy, Sadhana Sargam, Alisha Chinai, Sunidhi Chauhan, Sapna Mukherjee, Poornima, Sapna Awasthi, Hema Sardesai, Shreya Ghoshal, Akriti Kakkar, Monali Thakur, Neha Kakkar, Jaspinder Narula and others.
Sanu also multiple duets with his daughter Shannon K, pop singer and songwriter, who has launched her career in the United States in 2017.

Sanu is also credited with the highest number of version songs and male duet hits with the finest singers of 1980s and 1990s. Some of the notable songs are as follows:

Politics 
He joined the Bharatiya Janata Party in 2004 in a ceremony headed by then Party President Venkaiah Naidu, but he later resigned to concentrate on singing.
He rejoined BJP on 2 December 2014, inducted by Amit Shah.

Comeback 
Sanu returned to playback singing in 2012. He made a comeback at the urge of composers Sajid–Wajid. Sajid-Wajid gave him "Chhammak Chhallo Chhail Chhabili", a wedding song with Shreya Ghoshal for the film Rowdy Rathore (2012). In 2015, Sanu replaced Lata Mangeshkar as the background voice of Yash Raj Films logo for the film Dum Laga Ke Haisha. This was the first time in YRF's 45-year history that the voice of Mangeshkar was replaced.

Awards 
 Filmfare awards — 1991–1995
 Padma Shri (2009)
 Screen award for Best Male Playback

Civil honours 

|-
|2023
|Dr Babasaheb Ambedkar National Contribution Award, [National Award At Rajbhavan Mumbai]
|[[Shri Bhagat Singh Koshiyari Honourable Governor Of Maharastra And Organiser Shri Gurubhai Sureshbhai Thakkar]]
|}

Filmfare Awards 
Won

Nominated

Other awards 
 2016 : Featured in "Most searched and popular Indian singers on Google in the last 10 years"
 2003 : Bollywood Music Award For "Best Artist of the Decade"
 2001: Channel V Award For Best Male Playback for "Chand Sitare" – Kaho Naa... Pyaar Hai
 2000 : Hero Honda Award For Best Playback Singer (Male) for "Aankhon Ki Gustakhiyan" – Hum Dil De Chuke Sanam
 2000 : Kalashree Award For Best Male Playback for "Chaand Sitare" – Kaho Naa... Pyaar Hai
 2000 : Nomination: IIFA Award for Best Male Playback for "Aankhon Ki Gustakhiyaan" – Hum Dil De Chuke Sanam
 2000 : Nomination: MTV Award for "Dil ne yeh" with Udit Narayan and Alka Yagnik
 1999 : Mohammed Rafi Memorial Award for Best Playback Singer For "Aankhon Ki Gustakhiyaan" – Hum Dil De Chuke Sanam
 1999 : Nomination: MTV Award for "Aankhon Ki Gustakhiyaan" With Kavita Krishnamurthy – Hum Dil De Chuke Sanam
 1999 : Zee Gold Awards for "Aankhon Ki Gustakhiyaan" – Hum Dil De Chuke Sanam
 1999 : Kalakar Awards for "Aankhon Ki Gustakhiyaan" – Hum Dil De Chuke Sanam
 1999 : Stardust Award for Best Playback Singer For "Aankhon Ki Gustakhiyaan" – Hum Dil De Chuke Sanam
 1999 : Anandalok Awards for Best Playback Singer (Male) Kumar Sanu for Ami Sei Meye
 1998 : Lions' Club Gold Award For Best Playback Singer "Ladki Badi Anjani Hai" – Kuch Kuch Hota Hai
 1998 : Anandalok Awards For Best Playback Singer (Male) Kumar Sanu for Gane Bhuban Bhoriye Debo
 1997 : BFJA Award for film Lathi
 1996 : BFJA Award for film Kencho Khurte Keote
 1995 : Channel V Award For Best Male Playback "Tujhe Dekha To Yeh Jaana Sanam" – Dilwale Dulhania Le Jayenge
 1995 : Ashirwad Award For Best Male Playback "Ek Ladki Ko Dekha" – 1942: A Love Story
 1995 : Screen Award for Best Male Playback for "Ek Ladki Ko Dekha" – 1942: A Love Story

See also 
List of Indian playback singers

References

External links 

 
 
 

1957 births
Living people
Bengali musicians
Bengali singers
Bharatiya Janata Party politicians from West Bengal
Bollywood playback singers
Indian film score composers
Indian male playback singers
Kannada playback singers
Nepali-language singers from India
Recipients of the Padma Shri in arts
Singers from Kolkata
University of Calcutta alumni
Indian male film score composers
Filmfare Awards winners
Screen Awards winners
Bengal Film Journalists' Association Award winners